Northwest Township may refer to:

 Northwest Township, Stone County, Arkansas, in Stone County, Arkansas
 Northwest Township, Orange County, Indiana
 Northwest Township, St. Louis County, Missouri, in St. Louis County, Missouri
 Northwest Township, Brunswick County, North Carolina, in Brunswick County, North Carolina
 Northwest Township, Dickey County, North Dakota, in Dickey County, North Dakota
 Northwest Township, Kidder County, North Dakota, in Kidder County, North Dakota
 Northwest Township, Williams County, Ohio

Township name disambiguation pages